The Mayor of Paris is the chief executive of Paris, the capital and largest city in France. The officeholder is responsible for the administration and management of the city, submits proposals and recommendations to the Council of Paris, is active in the enforcement of the city's ordinances, submits the city's annual budget and appoints city officers, department commissioners or directors, as well as members of city boards and commissions. During meetings of the Council of Paris, the mayor serves as the presiding officer, as it is the case in any other commune in France. Since Paris doubles as a department as well, the mayor also has the rank of a departmental council president.

History
When the French Revolution began after the storming of the Bastille on 14 July 1789, the city insurgents murdered the last Provost of Paris (Provost of the Merchants), Jacques de Flesselles. Because the Provost's office was abolished as one of the first moves with the dissolution of the Ancien Régime, the insurgents established a revolutionary government called the "Commune of Paris", initially led by Jean Sylvain Bailly, the first titled "Mayor of Paris". The Mayor's office was very important during the critical phases of the Revolution, and during Robespierre's Reign of Terror (1793–1794) it was decisive in the discovery and execution of all suspected counter-revolutionaries.
In July 1794, after the 9th Thermidor, the coup d'état that deposed and executed Robespierre and his cronies, the office of Mayor was abolished since it was perceived to be too powerful.

After the February Revolution of 1848, the July Monarchy ended in favor of a new Republic, that restored the Mayor's office. This renewal was however short, as the June Days uprising of the same year ended the possibility of creating a strong mayorship. The Executive Commission—charged to provisionally rule the country—preferred to transfer the Mayor's powers to the Seine Prefect, appointed by Ministry of the Interior.

In 1870, once again, the office of Mayor of Paris was re-established and again did not survive long. The occasion for the re-creation was the fall of the Second Empire after the defeat in the Franco-Prussian War. The provisional Government of National Defense of Louis-Jules Trochu believed that a strong leadership in Paris would prevent sedition during the Prussian siege. After the definitive conquest of Paris by Prussians, popular discontent erupted in a new insurrectionary Commune which held socialist beliefs. Also, in case the Commune was finally suppressed, the new national government preferred to divide Paris into several distinct mayorships (one for each arrondissement) to prevent the city's total loss in the event of further revolts.

Thus, for all but 14 months from 1794 to 1977, Paris was the only commune of France without a mayor, and had less autonomy than even the smallest village. For most of the time from 1800 to 1977 (except briefly in 1848 and 1870–71), it was controlled directly by the departmental prefect (the prefect of the Seine before 1968 and prefect of Paris after 1968). In 1975 Parliament passed a bill re-establishing an elected mayor for Paris, beginning in 1977. The bill was signed by President Valéry Giscard d'Estaing on 31 December 1975. In March 1977, after the first formal municipal election, former Prime Minister Jacques Chirac was chosen as Mayor of Paris, a position he held until 1995, when was elected President of France.

List of officeholders

Notes
† Died in office

See also 
 Administration of Paris

References 
A list of provosts of the merchants (deleted from this article in 2017) is found in La Grande Encyclopédie, volume 25, page 1063, published in 1899. See scan of the full text at Gallica: .
The list of mayors since 1789 comes from Paris city hall's website. See Historique des maires de Paris.

Paris

Mayors